Glass tiles are pieces of glass formed into consistent shapes.

Early history
Glass was used in mosaics as early as 2500 BC, but it took until the 3rd century BC before innovative artisans in Greece, Persia  and India created glass tiles.

Whereas clay tiles are dated as early as 8000 BC, there were significant barriers to the development of glass tiles,  included the high temperatures required to melt glass, and the complexities of mastering various annealing curves for glass.

In recent years, glass tiles have become popular for both field and accent tiles. This trend can be attributed to recent technological breakthroughs, as well as the tiles’ inherent properties, in particular their potential to impart intense color and reflect light, and their imperviousness to water.

Glass tile introduces complexities to the installer.  Since glass is more rigid than ceramic or porcelain tile, glass tiles break more readily under the duress of substrate shifts.

Smalti tiles
Smalti tile, sometimes referred to as Byzantine glass mosaic tile, are typically opaque glass tiles that were originally developed for use in mosaics created during the time of the Byzantine empire.

Smalti is made by mixing molten glass with metal oxides for color in a furnace; the result is a cloudy mixture that is poured into flat slabs that are cooled and broken into individual pieces. The molten mixture can also be topped with gold leaf, followed by a thin glass film to protect against tarnishing. During the Byzantine era, Constantinople became the center of the mosaic craft, and the use of gold leaf glass mosaic reached perhaps its greatest artistic expression in the former seat of the Orthodox patriarch of Constantinople, the Hagia Sophia.

Traditional smalti tiles are still found today in many European churches and ornamental objects; the method is also used by some present-day artisans, both in installations and fine art. In the 1920s, mass production methods were applied to Smalti tile manufacturing, which enabled these tiles to find their way into many middle-class homes. Instead of the old method of rolling the colored glass mixture out, cooling, and cutting, the new method called for molten liquid to be poured and cooled in trays, usually resulting in 3/4 inch chicklet-type pieces.

Modern era

Since the 1990s, a variety of modern glass tile technologies, including methods to take used glass and recreate it as ‘green’ tiles, has resulted in a resurgence of interest in glass tile as a floor and wall cladding. It is now most commonly used in pools, kitchens, spas, and bathrooms. And while smalti tiles are still popular, small and large format glass products are now commonly formed using cast and fused glass methods. The plasticity of these last two methods has resulted in a wide variety of looks and applications, including floor tiles.

In the late 1990s, special glass tiles have been coated on the back side with a receptive white coating. This has allowed impregnation of heat-transfer dyes by a printing process reproducing high resolution pictures and designs. Custom printed glass tile and glass tile murals exhibit the toughness of glass on the wearing surface with photo-like pictures. These are especially practical in kitchens and showers, where cleanser and moisture resistance are important.

See also 
 Stained glass
 Glass mosaic

References

External links

Decorative arts
Mosaic
Visual arts materials
Glass art
Glass architecture
Glass applications
Tiling